Jean-Pascal Biezen (born 31 May 1979 in Amsterdam) is a Dutch retired professional footballer.

Club career
He played for Eerste Divisie clubs Stormvogels Telstar and FC Oss during the 1998-2005 football seasons. In September 2001 Biezen was taken to hospital with a brain injury after being involved in a car accident alongside fellow Telstar players Orlando Smeekes, Germaine Levant and Melvin Holwijn.

Biezen retired from playing in 2008 at DOVO, whom he had joined in 2003 and again in 2005 after another stint in professional football with TOP Oss.

References

External links
Voetbal international profile

1979 births
Living people
Footballers from Amsterdam
Association football fullbacks
Dutch footballers
SC Telstar players
TOP Oss players
Eerste Divisie players
VV DOVO players